Lake Hayward is in Sawyer County, Wisconsin, United States. It is fed by the Namekagon River and is part of the Saint Croix National Scenic Riverway.

The Lumberjack Bowl is a large bay on Lake Hayward that is used for the Lumberjack World Championship.

References

Hayward